Epacris obtusifolia, commonly known as blunt-leaf heath, is a species of flowering plant from the heath family, Ericaceae, and is endemic to eastern Australia. It is an erect shrub with few stems, crowded, oblong to elliptic leaves and tube-shaped white or cream-coloured flowers arranged along the stems.

Description
Flowering occurs throughout the year with a peak from July to January.

Taxonomy
Epacris obtusifolia was first formally described in 1804 by James Edward Smith in his Exotic Botany. The specific epithet (obtusifolia) means "blunt-leaved".

Distribution and habitat
Blunt-leaf heath grows in swampy areas and heathland in eastern Australia. It occurs along the coast and nearby tablelands of south-eastern Queensland and eastern New South Wales, southern Victoria and Tasmania.

Ecology
In the Sydney region, E. obtusifolia is associated with such plants as coral fern (Gleichenia dicarpa), swamp banksia (Banksia robur), and the sedge Lepidosperma limicola. Plants live between ten and twenty years, and are killed by fire and regenerate from seed which lies dormant in the soil. The seedlings reach flowering age within four years.

Use in horticulture
Epacris obtusifolia can be propagated by cutting and requires a well-drained yet moist position in the garden. It was first cultivated in the United Kingdom in 1804.

References 

obtusifolia
Ericales of Australia
Flora of New South Wales
Flora of Queensland
Flora of Victoria (Australia)
Flora of Tasmania
Plants described in 1804
Taxa named by James Edward Smith